Mario Alejandro Cuevas Mena (born 16 May 1972) is a Mexican politician affiliated with the PRD. He served as Deputy of the LXII Legislature of the Mexican Congress representing Yucatán, and he previously served in the LVII Legislature of the Congress of Yucatán.

References

1972 births
Living people
Politicians from Yucatán (state)
Party of the Democratic Revolution politicians
21st-century Mexican politicians
Deputies of the LXII Legislature of Mexico
Members of the Chamber of Deputies (Mexico) for Yucatán
Members of the Congress of Yucatán